Misteryo sa Tuwa (English: Joyful Mystery) is a 1984 Philippine period drama and political thriller film written and directed by Abbo Q. Dela Cruz for the Experimental Cinema of the Philippines. Set in the town of Lucban, Quezon in 1950, three men Ponsoy (Tony Santos Sr.), Mesiong (Johnny Delgado), and Jamin (Ronnie Lazaro) discovered and retrieved a suitcase from a plane crash site and never reported it to the authorities and when the authorities approach Alcalde Valle, the town's mayor, to help find the suitcase, the latter made a vicious plan to steal the money for his greed. It also stars Amable Quiambao, Alicia Alonzo, Maria Montes, Vangie Labalan, Lito Anzures, and the extras in the film that tackles greed, corruption, and hatred.

Misteryo sa Tuwa was released by the Experimental Cinema of the Philippines on December 25, 1984.

Summary 
In a peaceful village in the footsteps of Mt. Banahaw, the people were gathered to celebrate a joyous occasion where the villagers and visitors have fun together. On that day, a plane crashes in a nearby area and many people were shocked by the incident. As they discover the remnants, many things and dead passengers were scattered all over the area but everyone saw a lot of items worth of fortune in the area where they stole and retrieve them in order to escape their lives of being poor. On the other hand, the three men Ponsoy, Mesiong, and Jamin steal a suitcase belonging to a dead American passenger from the plane crash which they vow not to report to the authorities.

By the time the authorities knew the knowledge of the suitcase being held by three men, the town mayor Pedro Valle, and his men including Castro, have decided to create necessary measures to suppress the three men and take the suitcase full of money for their personal gains. As the film progresses, the motivations of the characters were exposed one by one as they were continued to be victimized by torture, abuse, and violence as the contingent of soldiers would begin their final assault to kill the pillagers in the mountains as an act of revenge for their violent attack in the village.

Plot 
On the morning of August 19, 1950, in the village where a military camp is situated, the three men Ponsoy, Mesiong, and Jamin, along with their families, are on their way home after the baptism of Ponsoy and Ada's son, Tiko. However, as they are almost near to their destination, the military jeep broke down and they were forced to walk on foot to the village. Despite the problem earlier, they are still on their way while the villagers are preparing and then, they invite Captain Salgado and the people at the camp to the occasion. By the time they arrive, the celebration started to become joyous when the villagers began to enjoy the music, dancing, and the food and drinks they serve.

Suddenly, as the villagers and soldiers enjoy the occasion, a plane crashes in the nearby forest, and began running for help. Moments later, they, including the trio, began to check the remains of the plane but instead of searching for survivors and recovering the remains of dead passengers, they start looting whatever they find in the said area, ranging from food to clothes, much to Captain Salgado's dismay and he told them to help with the soldiers instead. While looting, Jamin discovered a black briefcase and it belonged to a dead American passenger nearby. However, Mesiong and Ponsoy believed that the suitcase's contents might be a bomb but when Castro shows up, they leave the area. As they are still looting, a gunshot was heard and the villagers believe that the Huks are back and flee as the soldiers would handle the situation.

At night, the people are happy with their recovered loot from the plane crash. In the case of Mesiong, Jamin, and Ponsoy, the contents of the black briefcase remained mysterious and they still believe that it is a bomb. While no one is watching, they decide to open the briefcase but when it was opened, they became surprised when they discover that the suitcase's contents are no other than money and began to divide every share among each other. On the next day, Pedro Valle, the town mayor, arrives with the soldiers, medical personnel, and two Chinese businessmen although the people thought that the Japanese soldiers are back. In the captain's office, the Chinese businessmen and Mayor Valle informed Captain Salgado about the plane crash, and the suitcase they want to find belonged to an American named Mr. Murphy, the business partner of the former. As the people and personnel help retrieve the dead from the plane crash, they discovered the remains of the American but his briefcase is gone.

Meanwhile, the trio still has no idea what are they going to do with the money they got from the recovered briefcase but Jamin is worried about Castro due to the said thing. While the personnel is leaving for Manila, Castro tells Mayor Valle about the briefcase and the latter made a deal with him. Castro agrees with the deal and admits to him that he was fed up living in the camp. With the worry about the rumors, Mesiong said that the money is ours and he would threaten to kill if someone wants to take back the money they got from the briefcase.

At the town's capital, the townsfolk gathered together at the Anti-Rat Campaign and Mayor Valle is present at the event. While the town secretary began to talk, Mayor Valle began creating a plan on taking back the briefcase with Santos, who has second thoughts about the plan he would do. On the following day, Mayor Valle returns to the camp and talks with the other men, especially Castro about the plan privately. Moments later, Ponsoy, Mesiong, Jamin, and the rest of the loggers return home but at night, things get even worse. A group of men, whose heads were covered with bayong, began terrorizing the village, kidnapping the trio one by one, and when Didong came to check at Mesiong's house, he was shot to death, leading to the panic of the villagers and soldiers. After Santos informed the success to Mayor Valle and started to regret it, the latter told the former that there will be no back-outs in the mission. The following morning, Mayor Valle arrives at the camp furious and asks Captain Salgado where Castro is at.

Within the mountains, the trio was tied up and held hostage by the men led by Castro, whom Captain Salgado noticed his unusual behavior in the previous days. Ponsoy, Mesiong, and Jamin were given torture and interrogation by Castro one by one and he asked where is the briefcase. On the day of Didong's funeral, a group of Hukbalahap 
arrived in the village but they told them that they were not involved in the crime of kidnapping the trio and Didong's death.

Cast

Tony Santos Sr. as Ponsoy
Johnny Delgado as Mesiong
Ronnie Lazaro as Jamin
Amable Quiambao as Ada
Alicia Alonzo as Pinang
Robert Antonio as Kapitan Salgado
Lito Anzures as Castro
Mario Taguiwalo as Alcalde Valle
Maria Montes as Ising
Ray Ventura as Santos
Perry Fajardo as Marcial
Susanna Faller as Inang Iska
Romeo Igloria as Benito
Mely Mallari as Marta
Vangie Labalan as Marcela
Benjamin Delina as Luis
Wilfredo Saludares as Didong
Filemon Faller as Julian
Lorenza Nanong as Priscilla
Kenneth Hutalla as Tiko
Mary Jane Salvanerra as Pinang's Baby
Susano Dealino as Kalihim Cruz

The director and its crew members also hired the townspeople of Lucban, Quezon, and the Lucban Theatre Ensemble as extras for the film as well as the Armed Forces of the Philippines. Peque Gallaga, the director of Oro, Plata, Mata, played the role of a dead American passenger.

Production 
Misteryo sa Tuwa was adapted from a winning entry from the scriptwriting contest of ECP in 1982.

The film was shot in the town of Lucban, Quezon, the hometown of the director Abbo Q. Dela Cruz and his brother Rosauro "Uro" Q. Dela Cruz who served as the crowd director of the film.

Release 
Misteryo sa Tuwa was released by the Experimental Cinema of the Philippines on December 25, 1984, as part of the 1984 Metro Manila Film Festival. In Japan, it was released on June 1, 1985, as one of the films exhibited for the 8th PIA Film Festival at PARCO Theater in Tokyo, Japan, and its literal Japanese title is also .

Digital restoration 
The film was restored by the ABS-CBN Film Restoration through the Kantana Post-Production (Thailand) Co. Ltd. and L'Immagine Ritrovata for the image restoration from film prints and Wildsound Studios for its color grading and audio restoration.

To address the issue of the damaged parts of Reel 3, the restoration team contacted the film's cinematographer Rody Lacap for the approval of fixing the parts of the film. In the end, Lacap decided to make the damaged parts to be colored in sepia tones. According to Leo P. Katigbak, head of the archives division, said that they could spend ₱500,000 on the colorization of the damaged scenes but it was turned down due to Lacap's instructions. The whole restoration process of Misteryo sa Tuwa cost ₱5 million and the total duration of restoring the film was 3,440 hours.

The restored version was premiered on November 11, 2019, at the Ayala Malls Manila Bay as part of the Cinema One Originals film festival. The premiere was attended by Vangie Labalan (one of the film's surviving cast members), film editor Jess Navarro, and the representatives of the cast and crew members of the film who are deceased or unable to attend: Wanggo Gallaga (son of Peque and Madeleine Gallaga), Rose S. Alimon (daughter of Tony Santos Sr.), Teresita V. Dela Cruz (wife of the film's director), Esperanza "Espie" Dela Cruz-Salva (sister of the director and the film's wardrobe assistant), Juan Miguel Escudero (nephew of the film's production designer Don Escudero) and Eduardo R. Meñez, the head of the Office of Strategic Communications and Research - Department of Foreign Affairs.

Reception

Critical reception
According to a review by Panos Kotzathanasis for Asian Movie Pulse, the film is considered "a great film that manages to communicate the plethora of its comments with utter eloquence, while entertaining significantly in the process." He praised the film's storyline and settings, the cast members, Rody Lacap's cinematography, and production designs by Rodell Cruz and Don Escudero.

From a review by Hayley Scanlon of Windows on Worlds, she described the film as "both a tale of human greed and selfishness", owing to the scenes that were alluded or referenced to the then-Martial Law era.

Matthew Ecosia of Film Geek Guy described the film's restoration as "far from perfect, but it is something special" and he praised the restoration efforts of ABS-CBN Film Restoration despite the encountered discolored and damaged frames that cannot be eliminated entirely by the restoration team. In terms of the film's story, he described it as "a tense display of how our drives as humans never really change regardless of time".

Accolades

Notes

References

External links 

1984 films
Philippine drama films
Tagalog-language films
Films about aviation accidents or incidents
Films about corruption